Goszczanówko  is a village in the administrative district of Gmina Drezdenko, within Strzelce-Drezdenko County, Lubusz Voivodeship, in western Poland. 

The village has a population of 140.

References

Villages in Strzelce-Drezdenko County